Mossbourne Victoria Park Academy is a coeducational secondary school located in the Victoria Park area of London, England, facing Well Street Common.

It is the second school to be named under Mossbourne Academy. The school was created in 2014: the building formerly used by Cardinal Pole Roman Catholic School was first built to drawings by Robert Lewis Roumieu for the French Hospital (La Providence), which opened there in 1865. In the summer of 2019 the first cohort's GCSE results placed the academy in the top 65 schools in England for student progress.

The school has two buildings: the Huguenot building and the Carroll building which is new and was officially opened in January 2015, It's current headteacher being Matthew Toothe. The school approaches it's behavioural policy in regards to a 'no excuses' attitude.

References 

Secondary schools in the London Borough of Hackney
Academies in the London Borough of Hackney
Educational institutions established in 2014
2014 establishments in England